For centuries, the watermills on the Zala river (Zala County, Western Transdanubia, Hungary) had co-existed in a single harmonious unity with each other as well as with the river, the Zala valley and Zala meadow, both latter ones renowned for their beauty. Landscape rehabilitation would indeed be necessary because due to the closure of the mills and the destruction of the sluices, the level of the ground water in the meadows, usually having very loamy soil, has dramatically decreased, which has had detrimental impacts on the condition of the meadows. The declining tendency in the grassland culture hasn't helped either. What is more, in several cases parts of the meadows were turned into arable lands or industrial sites. The final blow to the deteriorating meadows that gradually grew characterless was dealt by the disgraceful regulation of the river Zala (rather meaning its canalisation) in the beginning of the 1960s (Izsák 2016). A further station of the process was the elimination of the mills from the life of the river for all. 
„There were about 200 known steam mills and watermills in the county Zala at the end of the 1800s (the territory of the county was much larger at that time though)(Molnár 2015). According to the statistical data of the Zala county archives of the year 1949, there were about 180 mills in operation in the county then (140 of which located in the county’s present, smaller territory). In the beginning of the 1940s, there were still about 37 mills grinding on the river Zala (Izsák and Kummer 2011). 
One can still find water in some old mill-ponds. For the history of a miller's family see Jakosa 2011, 2012, both in Hungarian). These ponds provide suitable habitat for some aquatic organisms. As for the history of the published data and photos, I. Hajdu, J. Izsák, Á. Jakosa, Gy. Kummer  and Mrs. M. Marx, the latter working with Göcseji Muzeum, Zalaegerszeg decided in 2004 to start gathering documents and data systematically on the watermills along the river Zala. We have based our selection of the mills to be presented on a list from the year 1949 preserved in the Zala-county archives. The chart was provided by Mr. Gy. Kummer. A significant number of the photos were also taken by him. The mills indicated by red characters exist today mainly in documents and in the mind's eye only. For the possibility of hydropower by the water of small rivers, e.g. Zala, see Gerse 2014.

Operation 

By sluice („barrage”), usually the full sluice system as well as the sluice gates themselves were referred to in live speech. The couple-of-hundred-meter-long section of the river above the mills that can be swollen by (wooden) sluice gates is called the head race. The river banks right above the sluice gate were often protected by concrete walls from erosion. On this river section, the lowered sluice gate barred and „swelled” or  „held” water behind it as one of the preparatory steps of grinding. By the way, the higher or lower position of the sluice before the turbine chamber and before the run-out to the mill-pond, one could control the volume of the water running through the turbine chamber to  rotate the turbine. This latter ensured the energy necessary for milling.  When grinding, the water was let out to flow onto the turbine encased in the turbine chamber protected by a lattice. From thereon, the water left the turbine chamber via its outlet into the mill pit. (Driftwood and other debris were cleared from the lattice by a rake.) Of course, in the meantime, the water level in the head race continuously decreased as the water was „let out” or „released”. Sluice gates could be raised or let down by specific iron structures. Directly above the sluice gate, practically annexed to it stood the sluice bridge that made it possible to get close to the sluice gates. One could also cross the river using this little bridge. There also used to be a larger bridge on the head race suited for the transportation of grains and flour, but it had usually been ruined by the 1950s and 1960s. During swelling, if the water level in the head race reached the upper edge of the lowered sluice gate, the water cascaded over it, and showered onto a concrete surface producing characteristic sounds, and then rushed into the wide and (3-to-8-meter) deep mill pit. The mill pit was used to be called mill pond in other locations. The expressions appearing in this paragraph aren't uniformly used anyway. It is certain though that the anglers in Zalaegerszeg used these terms in the 1950s. At the lower end of the mill pit that narrowed again, usually a crescent-shaped gravel islet formed. The following outflow section was shallow, and continuously deepened again. The water often meandered along an extended tract, flowing ever slower, and getting ever deeper, to become the head race of the following mill. In some cases, the river was bifurcated above the mill by digging a new branch leading to the mill (and serving as its „head race” or „leat”). On the other branch („small branch) there was also a sluice called „small sluice”. (If I remember well, the related smaller „mill pond” was also called a small pond by the anglers in the past.) By the sluice, one could control the amount of water flowing towards the main branch of the river. The small pond located behind the small sluice flowed into the small branch to rejoin the main branch after about 100 to 200 meters. As far as I recall, small branches and small sluices could only be found in Zalaegerszeg or further downward on the river Zala (but not even there in all the cases: e.g. in the 1950s the Baumgartner mill in Zalaegerszeg didn't feature a small sluice). In the riverbed hollows or incavations could form while in other tracts the water was shallow and running. During floods, everything got messed up: in the stead of the river Zala and its meadow, a spectacular, uninterrupted expanse of water appeared that a few days later receded. 
In several comments, we refer to piles sticking out from or standing in the water in the immediate vicinity of the mills. The corner of the mill closest to the water was often supported by such a pile. In other cases, the piles upheld a proper planking above the water. Standing on such a planking, one could do maintenance work on the sluice gates, e.g. defrost them. But similar piles may also be remains of old-time wooden bridges.                                                                                             
The structure equipped with its own little roof and window often raised on top of the mill building is the ventage of the powder-house, but it could also be used to accommodate the protruding end of the elevator. One could often see a „rain panel” sticking out above the door of the building that protected the people and the sacs from the rain during loading. The by-products of grinding could be used to feed pigs and poultry. Therefore, apart from the stable housing the work-horses, there were often piggeries, henneries or even pigeonries in the vicinity of the mills.

The mills below are referred to primarily by their location, secondarily by their popular name(s). The latter one usually coincides with the name of the last owner or sometimes with that of the tenant. 
In several cases, the mill ponds even today retain significant amounts of water. One of the potential reasons is that in the old days, springlets surviving up to the present emerged at the bottom of the then several-meter-deep water.

List of the watermills

Gallery

Sources 

László Molnár: One-time watermills in present-day Zalaegerszeg. Zalai Múzeum, 2015, vol. 22. pp. 301–330. (in Hungarian, with an English summary) 
Árpád Jakosa: Our Family! Genealogy. (In Hungarian) Manuscript, 2012.
Árpád Jakosa: The mills. (In Hungarian) Manuscript, 2011.
János Izsák, Gyula Kummer: Data on the last decades of the mills on Zala river. (In Hungarian) Manuscript, 2011.
János Izsák: Additional photos and information on research of watermill on Zala. (In Hungarian) Manuscript, 2016.
Károly Gerse: Contribution of hydropower utilization and EU's plans (in Hungarian). Magyar Tudomány 2014, vol. 175. pp. 779–789.

Buildings and structures in Zala County
Grinding mills
Industrial buildings in Hungary
Watermills